was an officer, ace fighter pilot, and leader in the Imperial Japanese Navy (IJN) during the Second Sino-Japanese War and the Pacific theater of World War II.  At the December 1941 Attack on Pearl Harbor, Shiga led one of the aircraft carrier Kaga's fighter divisions during the first strike on American forces on Oahu. The number of his Zero fighter was AII-105. Shiga continued as a fighter division commander on Kaga until April 1942.

In May 1942, then Lieutenant Shiga took command of aircraft carrier Jun'yō's fighter group, a post he held until December 1942. During this time, Shiga led the carrier's fighters in the battles of Dutch Harbor and the Santa Cruz Islands. He subsequently commanded the aircraft carrier Hiyō's fighter group from December 1942 through January 1943 while the carrier was in port in Japan.

After promotion to Lieutenant Commander, Shiga was assigned as air officer to the 343rd Air Group which was engaged in homeland defence in Japan, based at Matsuyama Air Base, in December 1944. He was projected to be Air Group Commander aboard the carrier Shinano during her brief time in service, but was not aboard for her fatal delivery voyage; he instead awaited the ship in Kure with the carrier's planned air group. He is famous for his strong objection against the tactic of suicide attack (Kamikaze) and saved the 
lives of many young Japanese pilots.

After the war, Shiga became president of police equipment manufacturer Nobel Kōgyō and made many devices such as bulletproof vests and extractable police batons for Japanese police. He died on 25 November 2005.

References

1914 births
2005 deaths
Attack on Pearl Harbor
Japanese naval aviators
Japanese World War II flying aces
Imperial Japanese Navy officers